1,3-Diaminopropane, also known as , is a simple diamine with the formula H2N(CH2)3NH2. A colourless liquid with a fishy odor, it is soluble in water and many polar organic solvents. It is isomeric with 1,2-diaminopropane.  Both are building blocks in the synthesis of heterocycles, such as those used in textile finishing, and coordination complexes. It is prepared by the amination of acrylonitrile followed by hydrogenation of the resulting aminopropionitrile.

The potassium salt was used in the alkyne zipper reaction.

Known uses of 1,3-diaminopropane are in the synthesis of piroxantrone and losoxantrone.

Safety

References

Diamines
NMDA receptor antagonists